Dark Side of the Morgue is the second of a series of original mystery/thrillers by former James Bond author Raymond Benson. Published in March 2009 by Leisure Books it has a rock and roll setting and features a detective named Spike Berenger. The book's title derives from Pink Floyd's album The Dark Side of the Moon.

In 2010, the novel was nominated for a Shamus Award for Best Paperback Original PI Novel of 2009 by the Private Eye Writers of America.

References

2009 American novels
American mystery novels
American thriller novels
Leisure Books books